Jack Richard Miller (June 6, 1916 – August 29, 1994) was an American politician and jurist who served as a Republican United States Senator from Iowa for two terms from 1961 to 1973. He later served as a United States circuit judge of the United States Court of Appeals for the Federal Circuit.

Education and career

Miller was born in Chicago, Illinois. He first moved to Sioux City, Iowa in 1932 as a teen. He attended The Oratory School in England, then received an Artium Baccalaureus degree from Creighton University in Omaha, Nebraska in 1938 and an Artium Magister degree from the Catholic University of America in Washington, D.C. in 1939. In World War II, Miller served with the United States Army Air Corps from 1942 to 1946, attaining the rank of lieutenant colonel. During this time his military service included the China-Burma-India Theater, the faculty at the Army Command and General Staff College at Fort Leavenworth, Kansas, and duty at Air Force Headquarters in Washington, D.C. After the war, Miller received his Juris Doctor from Columbia Law School in 1946, and did postgraduate study at University of Iowa College of Law later that year. He served between 1947 and 1948 as an attorney with the Office of Chief Counsel of the United States Internal Revenue Service. After one year as an assistant professor of law at Notre Dame Law School, he then returned to Sioux City, where he went into private practice.

Political career

Miller was elected to the Iowa House of Representatives in 1955, and to the Iowa Senate in 1957. Miller was first elected to the United States Senate in 1960. In a race to replace the retiring Republican Senator Thomas E. Martin, Miller defeated Iowa's sitting governor, Herschel C. Loveless, in a close contest. Senator Miller was a member of the Senate Finance Committee. He was reelected in 1966, easily defeating Democrat E.B. Smith, but in 1972 was upset by Democrat Dick Clark. During a phone call in the early hours of the morning following that election, President Nixon told Henry Kissinger that "we lost Jack Miller because he's a jackass."

Miller voted in favor of the Civil Rights Act of 1964, as well as the 24th Amendment to the U.S. Constitution, the Voting Rights Act of 1965, and the confirmation of Thurgood Marshall to the U.S. Supreme Court, while Miller did not vote on the Civil Rights Act of 1968.

Federal judicial service

Miller was nominated by President Richard Nixon on June 28, 1973, to a seat on the United States Court of Customs and Patent Appeals vacated by Judge J. Lindsay Almond He was confirmed by the United States Senate on June 28, 1973, and received his commission on July 6, 1973. He was reassigned by operation of law on October 1, 1982, to the United States Court of Appeals for the Federal Circuit, to a new seat authorized by 96 Stat. 25. He assumed senior status on June 6, 1985. His service terminated on August 29, 1994, due to his death.

Retirement and death

Miller retired to Temple Terrace, Florida where he died on August 29, 1994. He is interred at Arlington National Cemetery.

References

Sources

External links
  Retrieved on 2008-02-07
 
 Federal Judicial Center CCPA entry on Jack Miller

1916 births
1994 deaths
20th-century American lawyers
United States Army Air Forces personnel of World War II
Burials at Arlington National Cemetery
Catholic University of America alumni
Columbia Law School alumni
Creighton University alumni
Iowa lawyers
Republican Party Iowa state senators
Judges of the United States Court of Appeals for the Federal Circuit
Judges of the United States Court of Customs and Patent Appeals
Republican Party members of the Iowa House of Representatives
Politicians from Chicago
Politicians from Sioux City, Iowa
Republican Party United States senators from Iowa
United States Army Air Forces officers
United States Army Command and General Staff College faculty
United States Article I federal judges appointed by Richard Nixon
20th-century American judges
University of Iowa College of Law alumni
University of Notre Dame faculty
People from Temple Terrace, Florida
20th-century American politicians
United States Army colonels
American expatriates in the United Kingdom